Iveagh Upper, Upper Half is the name of a barony in County Down, Northern Ireland. It was created by 1851 with the division of the barony of Iveagh Upper into two. It lies to the west and south of the county, split in half by the Lordship of Newry. It is bordered by six other baronies: Mourne to the south; Iveagh Upper, Lower Half to the east; Iveagh Lower, Lower Half and Iveagh Lower, Upper Half to the north; and Orior Lower and Orior Upper to the west.

List of settlements
Below is a list of the villages and population centres in Iveagh Upper, Upper Half:

Towns
Banbridge
Warrenpoint

Villages
Loughbrickland
Poyntzpass (split with Orior Lower)
Rathfriland
Rostrevor

Hamlets and population centres
Annaclone
Ballinaskeagh
Burren
Donaghmore
Drumgath
Killowen
Scarva

List of civil parishes
Below is a list of civil parishes in Iveagh Upper, Upper Half:
Aghaderg (also partly in barony of Iveagh Lower, Lower Half (two townlands) and Iveagh Upper, Lower Half (one townland))
Annaclone
Clonallan
Clonduff (one townland, rest in barony of Iveagh Upper, Lower Half)
Donaghmore (also partly in barony of Iveagh Lower, Upper Half (two townlands))
Drumgath 
Kilbroney (also partly in barony of Iveagh Upper, Lower Half (one townland))
Kilcoo (one townland, rest in barony of Iveagh Upper, Lower Half)
Moira (one townland, rest in barony of Iveagh Lower, Upper Half)
Seapatrick (also partly in baronies of Iveagh Lower, Lower Half and Iveagh Lower, Upper Half)
Warrenpoint

References